The Gaylactic Spectrum Awards are given to works of science fiction, fantasy and horror that explore LGBT (lesbian, gay, bisexual or transgender) topics in  a positive way. They were founded in 1998, first presented by the Gaylactic Network in 1999. In 2002 they were given their own organization, the Gaylactic Spectrum Awards Foundation.

Since their inception, awards have been given in categories for novels, short fiction, and best other work. Other categories have also been added and removed in intervening years. Works produced before the inception of the awards are eligible to be inducted into the "Hall of Fame". The novels category is open to submissions of novels released during the prior calendar year in North America that includes "significant positive GLBT content". The results are decided by a panel of judges from the list of submitted nominees; the long list of nominees is reduced to a short list of finalists, and the results are generally announced and presented at Gaylaxicon, an annual convention devoted to LGBT-themed science fiction. This article lists all the "Best Novel" award nominees and winners and novels inducted into the Hall of Fame.

Each award consists of an etched image on lucite on a stand, using a spiral galaxy in a triangle logo, based on the logo the Gaylactic Network. The award winner's name, work title, award year, and award category are etched on a small plaque on the base or on the plexiglass itself. A small cash stipend is awarded to winners in the Best Novel category. The cost of the awards is met through individual donations and fundraising events.

Laurie J. Marks and Melissa Scott have both won the award twice. Elizabeth Bear holds the record for most nominations, with ten nominations and one win.

Novel winners and nominees
In the following table, the years correspond to the year of the award ceremonies; the books were released is the preceding years. Entries with a lavender background have won the relevant award; those with a white background are the nominees on the short-list. Superscript letters after the result indicate simultaneous nominations in other categories.

 Also won the People's Choice Award.

 The awards for 2014 and 2015 were combined into a single ceremony and presented in 2015

Hall of Fame novels
In the following table, the years correspond to the year of the award ceremonies; the books were all first published before the founding of the awards in 1998. No novels have been inducted into the Hall of Fame since 2003. Entries in bold and with a lavender background were inducted into the Hall of Fame that year; those that are neither highlighted nor in bold were not inducted that year (NI), but may be inducted later (IL). Superscript letters after the result indicate simultaneous nominations in other categories.

 Also won the People's Choice Award.

See also

 Homosexuality in speculative fiction
 Lambda Literary Awards winners and nominees for science fiction, fantasy and horror
 Gaylactic Spectrum Award winners and nominees for best short fiction
 Gaylactic Spectrum Award winners and nominees for best other work

References

External links
The Gaylactic Spectrum Awards official site

Best Novel
Lists of LGBT-related award winners and nominees
Lists of speculative fiction-related award winners and nominees